Scott Harry Nathaniel Arfield (born 1 November 1988) is a professional association footballer who plays as a midfielder for Scottish Premiership club Rangers.

He began his career at Falkirk before moving to the English leagues for eight years with Huddersfield Town and Burnley. Born and raised in Scotland, Arfield represented his nation of birth at international youth levels before switching to Canada in 2016.

Club career

Falkirk
Arfield came up through the Falkirk Youth Academy and earned promotion to the first team squad. He made his Falkirk debut on 4 August 2007, in their 4–0 win away at Gretna on the opening day of the 2007–08 season. His first goal came in Falkirk's 4–2 defeat at Inverness Caledonian Thistle. He then scored twice in a 4–0 win over St Mirren. He won the Scottish Premier League Young Player of the Month award for December 2007. Arfield signed a new five-year contract with Falkirk in February 2008. He finished the season with three goals in 35 SPL appearances.

During the 2008–09 season Arfield won his second Young Player of the Month award, this time winning for September 2008. He was in the Falkirk side that were Scottish Cup runners-up, losing 1–0 to Rangers in the final at Hampden Park. Arfield scored 10 goals in the 2008–09 season, seven of them coming in the league.

He was given the number 10 jersey, previously worn by Steven Pressley, for the 2009–10 season. Hamilton Academical offered £100,000 for Arfield in August 2009, but this was rejected by Falkirk, who commented that they "thought they had missed out a zero in the figure they offered".

Arfield's first appearance of the 2009–10 season came in a 1–0 home win over FC Vaduz in the UEFA Europa League, the club's first ever match in European competition. He finished the season with three goals from 36 appearances as the club were relegated from the SPL.

Speculation began to grow that Arfield was to leave Falkirk following their relegation from the SPL. On 17 May 2010, it was confirmed that Arfield was having talks with Huddersfield Town and was to have a medical at the club. Falkirk had already turned down offers from Hamilton Academical, Hibernian, Hearts and Southampton.

Arfield left Falkirk after playing 108 games, scoring 13 times between 2007 and 2010. He made his last appearance for Falkirk in the 0–0 draw with Kilmarnock that confirmed relegation on the last day of the season.

Huddersfield Town
On 21 May 2010, it was reported that Arfield had signed for Huddersfield Town for a reported fee initially in the region of £400,000 but potentially rising to over £600,000 after a certain number of appearances. The move was confirmed three days later, after the club and the player had agreed personal terms. He made his Huddersfield debut in the 3–0 win over Notts County at Meadow Lane on 7 August 2010. On 11 September 2010, he scored his first goal for the Terriers at Brisbane Road against Leyton Orient, where Town won 2–1. A week later, he scored his first goal at the Galpharm Stadium against Yeovil Town, in a 4–2 win for the home side.

Arfield was a regular in the Huddersfield side, making 38 appearances and scoring twice in all competitions as they finished the season as Play-off champions and gained promotion to the Championship after beating Sheffield United on penalties in the Wembley final, Arfield scoring his penalty to make it 2–1 as Huddersfield won by 8–7. Arfield made fewer appearances in Town's first season in the Championship, and at the end of the season was released along with Tom Clarke and Alan Lee.

Burnley
After leaving Huddersfield, Arfield went on trial with Burnley and scored in the 3–0 win over Cork City on 15 July 2013, before signing a two-year deal 4 days later with the Clarets. Arfield selected the number 37 shirt in memory of fellow Falkirk youth player Craig Gowans, who wore the same squad number when he was tragically killed in a training ground accident in 2005. He scored his first professional goal for Burnley on 6 August 2013, in a 4–0 win against York City in the League Cup. Arfield scored 9 goals in 49 competitive appearances for Burnley during the 2013–14 season. Burnley won promotion to the Premier League and Arfield signed a three-year contract with the club in July 2014. Arfield scored on his Premier League debut for Burnley against Chelsea in the 14th minute of their opening game of the season.

Rangers
Arfield returned to Scotland and signed a four-year deal with  Rangers on 14 May 2018. He made his debut for the club on 12 July 2018 in a Europa League qualification tie against FK Shkupi of Macedonia, and made his Scottish Premiership debut a few weeks later on 5 August, against Aberdeen.

On 7 April 2019, Arfield scored his first professional hat-trick in a 3–0 victory against Motherwell.

International career

Scotland
Arfield represented Scotland at under-19, under-21 and B international levels. He made his debut for Scotland under-19 in a 3–1 away friendly victory over Austria. His second and last outing for the under-19s came four days later in the 2–1 home win over Norway, coming on as a substitute for Alex Pearce in the 65th minute of the game.

Arfield was then a member of the Scotland under-21 squad, being called up for the first time in October 2007. His debut came in a 4–0 defeat against Netherlands on 16 October 2007. He was a regular in Billy Stark's squad throughout the 2009 and 2011 European qualifying campaigns. Arfield's first goal for the under-21s came in a 2–2 draw with Ukraine on 6 February 2008.

Arfield received his first cap for Scotland B against Northern Ireland at the Excelsior Stadium in Airdrie on 6 May 2009. Scotland won the game 3–0.

Canada

Arfield also qualified to play for Canada, because his father was born in Toronto. In February 2016, it was widely reported that Arfield was prepared to file his one-time switch paperwork with FIFA, which was needed for him to join the Canada squad. In March 2016, Arfield was included in Canada's 23-man squad for their World Cup Qualification match against Mexico. He made his debut on 25 March as a second half substitute for Tosaint Ricketts in a 3–0 home defeat to Mexico at BC Place. Arfield was named to Canada's squad for the 2017 CONCACAF Gold Cup on 27 June 2017. His first goal for Canada came in the tournament opener against French Guiana on 7 July.
In 2018, at the opening of Canada's Nations League campaign, Arfield was named captain of the squad in their match against U.S. Virgin Islands. In May 2019, Arfield was named to the squad for the 2019 CONCACAF Gold Cup. During an unofficial training match prior to the 2019 Gold Cup on 10 June, he scored both goals in a 2–0 win against Trinidad and Tobago.

In October 2020 Rangers coach Steven Gerrard suggested that Arfield had retired from international duty. Arfield later refuted the claim in an interview with Rangers TV, stating that his continued involvement with Canada would be up to coach John Herdman. After missing Canada's 2022 World Cup qualifiers in March and June 2021, Arfield was named to the provisional 60-man squad for the 2021 CONCACAF Gold Cup, but did not make the final 23-man team.

In January 2022 Arfield announced his international retirement.

Career statistics

Club

International

Scores and results list Canada's goal tally first, score column indicates score after each Arfield goal. Goals scored in unofficial friendlies and exhibition matches not counted.

Honours

Huddersfield Town
Football League One play-offs: 2012

Burnley
Football League Championship: 2015–16; runners-up: 2013–14

Rangers
Scottish Premiership: 2020–21
Scottish Cup: 2021–22
Scottish League Cup runner-up: 2019–20
 UEFA Europa League runner-up: 2021–22

See also
List of sportspeople who competed for more than one nation

References

External links
 
 
 

1988 births
Living people
Footballers from West Lothian
Sportspeople from Livingston, West Lothian
People from Dechmont
Scottish people of Canadian descent
Citizens of Canada through descent
People educated at St Margaret's Academy
Scottish footballers
Canadian soccer players
Association football midfielders
Falkirk F.C. players
Huddersfield Town A.F.C. players
Burnley F.C. players
Rangers F.C. players
Scottish Premier League players
Scottish Professional Football League players
English Football League players
Premier League players
Scotland youth international footballers
Scotland under-21 international footballers
Scotland B international footballers
Canada men's international soccer players
2017 CONCACAF Gold Cup players
2019 CONCACAF Gold Cup players